WPEC (channel 12) is a television station in West Palm Beach, Florida, United States, affiliated with CBS. It is owned by Sinclair Broadcast Group alongside Fort Pierce–licensed CW affiliate WTVX (channel 34) and two low-power, Class A stations: MyNetworkTV affiliate WTCN-CD (channel 43) and TBD owned-and-operated station WWHB-CD (channel 48). The stations share studios on Fairfield Drive in Mangonia Park (with a West Palm Beach postal address), while WPEC's transmitter is located southeast of Wellington, Florida.

History

The station signed on as an ABC affiliate with the callsign WEAT-TV on January 1, 1955. It was owned by RKO General. Its original studios were on South Congress Avenue in West Palm Beach. RKO sold the station to Rex Rand in 1957. In 1964, Gardens Broadcasting, a company founded by businessman John D. MacArthur bought the station. In 1973, Photo Electronics bought the station from John D. MacArthur. The station moved to its present studio facilities on Fairfield Drive in Mangonia Park that same year. On January 27, 1974, the WEAT calls were changed to the current WPEC which stood for Photo Electronics Corporation in reference to the station's then-current owner, a company founded by local entrepreneur Alexander W. Dreyfoos, Jr. The previous calls are currently used by an area radio station owned by Hubbard Broadcasting.

On January 1, 1989, it switched affiliations to CBS after the network purchased WCIX in Miami (channel 6, now WFOR-TV on channel 4) from the TVX Broadcast Group. WCIX's over-the-air signal was weaker than the other Miami VHF stations in Fort Lauderdale and Broward County. In contrast, WPEC, like nearly all of the West Palm Beach stations, provides city-grade coverage to most of Broward County. New sign-on WPBF took WPEC's old ABC affiliation, forcing former CBS affiliate WTVX to become an independent station. A similar situation happened to NBC in 1995 when WCIX moved to channel 4 as WFOR and NBC was demoted to channel 6 as WTVJ.

This caused WPEC to lose much of its Broward County audience to WFOR. As a result, rival West Palm Beach station WPTV gained Broward County NBC market share from WTVJ that was now on channel 6. In 1996, Freedom Communications bought the station. On April 8, 2009, WPEC announced that it was eliminating its 24-hour local weather channel (known as "CBS 12 Now") in favor of a new local Spanish-language television station originally known as "232 Mi Pueblo TV". However, the weather channel was reinstated on digital channel 12.3 in mid-2009.

Freedom announced on November 2, 2011, that it would bow out of television and sell its stations, including WPEC, to the Sinclair Broadcast Group. Sinclair had earlier announced the acquisition of Four Points Media Group, owner of WTVX, and the two purchases resulted in the first full duopoly in West Palm Beach. Sinclair began operating the Four Points stations (including WTVX and its low-power sisters) through time brokerage agreements at some point in October; the company entered into a similar arrangement with the Freedom stations (including WPEC) two months later. The deal was completed on April 2, 2012, although the physical operations of WPEC and WTVX (along with WTCN and WWHB) initially remained separate. WTVX, WTCN, and WWHB would eventually move into WPEC's studios.

WPEC formerly housed the studios for the American Sports Network, a Sinclair-run sports channel and syndication service. After its replacement with Stadium (whose studio programming is based out of Chicago), WPEC retained the ASN set as a secondary studio, first using it as a temporary set during the reconstruction of the station's main studio, and later being used for a remotely-produced newscast for sister station WGFL in Gainesville.

Programming

Syndicated programming
Syndicated programming on WPEC includes Inside Edition, Entertainment Tonight, and Dr. Phil among others, all of which are distributed by CBS Media Ventures.

News operation

Following the May 2009 sweeps period, WPEC finished in third place in household ratings in the early weeknight time slots. WPTV regularly beats WPBF and WPEC in Nielsen ratings as the most watched station in the West Palm Beach market. The NBC affiliate regularly retains its title as the most-watched television station in the state of Florida based on sign-on to sign-off household ratings in metered markets. For most of the time, WPBF has more or less remained at second place.

After Fox required most of its affiliates to air local newscasts, the area's affiliate WFLX (then owned by Malrite Communications; eventually acquired by Raycom Media) entered into a news share agreement with WPEC. On September 11, 1991, this station started producing a nightly prime time broadcast on that channel known as Fox 29 10 O'Clock News. Originally thirty minutes long, it soon expanded to a full hour. In 2000, an hour-long weekday morning show at 7 began to air on WFLX entitled Fox 29 Morning News. This effort was expanded to two hours on September 6, 2006. On Friday and Sunday nights, there was also a sports highlight show called SportsZone that was shown on that channel.

WFLX and WPEC maintained separate news sets and on-air identities but shared a weather set and most on-air personnel (the Fox outlet had its own entertainment reporter/website producer). Although all newscasts originated from WPEC's current studios, presentation on WFLX was done under the direction of Raycom Media which was credited in the closings. The graphics package and music theme used was similar to ones seen on other Raycom-owned stations with in house local news departments. On January 31, 2008, WPEC and WFLX became the second and third stations respectively in West Palm Beach to upgrade local newscast production to high definition level. On both stations, the upgrade included new sets. For WFLX, a separate updated Raycom Media-corporate graphics package was added.

It was announced on October 22, 2010 that WFLX would end the news share arrangement with WPEC on December 31. On January 1, 2011, WPTV (owned by the E. W. Scripps Company) established a new partnership with WFLX and began producing the two-hour weekday morning show and nightly hour-long prime time program. These newscasts now originate from a secondary set at WPTV's facility. In April 2004, WPEC started using "Doppler 12000 StormTrac" (now known as "CBS 12 StormTrac Radar") regional weather radar technology similar to the VIPIR system used by rival WPTV. However, unlike that station which actually operates its own radar device, WPEC receives delayed data from the National Weather Service.

On March 1, 2008, this station added weekend morning newscasts. On September 7, 2013, WPEC canceled its 7 p.m. newscast that was seen Monday through Saturday nights (it was the only television station in the market to air local news in the time slot) in preparation to move resources to launch a weeknight-only primetime newscast at 10 p.m. on WTVX. This half-hour production was expected to begin in January 2014 but was pushed back to March 3. It is WTVX's third showing of local news of any kind since its inception.

On August 11, 2014, WPEC debuted a half-hour 3:00 p.m. newscast, making it one of the very few stations in the U.S. to have a newscast in that timeslot, and is the only 3:00 p.m. newscast in the South Florida market. This newscast made its debuts as a replacement for the hour-long talk show, Bethenny, which was canceled that season (the second half of the 3:00 p.m. hour was filled by reruns of Family Feud). The newscast was eventually expanded to an hour. This particular newscast is different, since it targets older women, and is anchored by three of WPEC's current news anchors, all of whom are female. It also uses the CBS Daytime talk-show, The Talk as a lead-in, which also generally targets a female audience.

Technical information

Subchannels
The station's digital signal is multiplexed:

Analog-to-digital conversion
WPEC discontinued regular programming on its analog signal, over VHF channel 12, on June 9, 2009 (three days before the most full-power television stations in the United States transitioned from analog to digital broadcasts under federal mandate on June 12). The station's digital signal remained on its pre-transition VHF channel 13 (its former analog channel began being used for the digital signal of WPTV three days later). Through the use of PSIP, digital television receivers display the station's virtual channel as its former VHF analog channel 12.

References

External links

PEC
CBS network affiliates
WeatherNation TV affiliates
Comet (TV network) affiliates
Television channels and stations established in 1955
RKO General
Sinclair Broadcast Group
1955 establishments in Florida